Darreh-ye Chinayi (also Romanized as Darreh-ye Chīnāyī) is a village in Chelo Rural District, Chelo District, Andika County, Khuzestan Province, Iran. At the 2006 census, its population was 33, in 5 families.

References 

Populated places in Andika County